Beatrice Wiafe Addai is a medical officer in Ghana and specializes in breast pathology and surgery.

Career 
In 1989, Beatrice Wiafe Addai began her medical officer career at Komfo Anokye Teaching Hospital. Her career as a surgeon also started at the same hospital in 1994 when she became a resident general surgeon. Then in 2002, she became a consultant in breast cancer management for SDA. Hospital which is also located in Ghana.

Positions 
Wiafe Addai established in 2002 the Peace and Love Hospitals and is currently the chief executive officer (C.E.O.). As of 2017, she is the president of AORTIC (African Organization for Research and Training in Cancer). Since 2016, she is a medical advisory board member of Direct Relief and became an executive member of the International Breast Cancer and Nutrition (ICBN). She is also a chairperson for the following organizations: Ghana Cancer Board, Ghana NCD Alliance, and Breast Cancer International Ghana Walk for the Cure.

Awards 
In 2010, Wiafe Addai won the International Gold Star for Leadership Award in Geneva, Switzerland. In 2011, she received the following awards: The International Award for Leadership in the Platinum Category, Africa's Global Person of the Year 2011, The Belgium-Based European Society for Research Award, and The European Award for Best Practices 2011.

In 2012 she won: Women that Soar Award, Constellation Quality and Excellence Award in the Diamond Category, Health and Excellence Award in the Diamond Category, and Global Education for all Initiative Award. She was awarded with the International Arch European Award in the Diamond Category in 2013, Susan Buckler's Excellence Award for Women in Science and Technology in 2014, and The Socrates European Award Business Award in 2017. Wiafe Addai achieved two awards in 2015: The Global Entrepreneur and Initiative Award and The Most Influential Woman's Award in the Category of Science and Education.

In 2016, she won the following awards: The GLITZ Woman of the Year Award, The Best Woman of the Year Award in Health Category, Global Person of Innovation in Science and Initiative, The Yaa Asantewa Award in the Men's Exclusive Honor, and The Most Philanthropic Woman's Award. Then in the year 2019, she achieved the following awards:  The Glory Award, Global Leader in Management Award, and the Distinguished African Ambassador Award.

References  

Place of birth missing (living people)
Living people
Year of birth missing (living people)
Ghanaian surgeons